The 2019 season was the Seattle Seahawks' 44th in the National Football League (NFL) and their 10th under head coach Pete Carroll. It marked their first full season since 1996 without longtime owner Paul Allen, who had died during the 2018 season.

For the first time since 2010, Earl Thomas did not play for the Seahawks as he signed with the Baltimore Ravens via free agency during the offseason. Thomas was the last remaining original member of the Legion of Boom defensive secondary. This was also the first time since 2010 without wide receiver Doug Baldwin, as he was released from the team after a failed physical designation, along with strong safety Kam Chancellor. Baldwin announced his retirement three days later.

The Seahawks set a franchise record for most road wins in a season by going 7–1. Their previous best was 6–2 during the 2013 season.

Notable events

On September 1, 2019, the Seahawks traded Jacob Martin, Barkevious Mingo and a 2020 3rd round pick (91st overall subsequently traded, Devin Asiasi) to the Houston Texans for star defensive end Jadeveon Clowney. Over his 13-game season, Clowney obtained 3 sacks, 1 interception, 13 QB hits, both an interception and fumble return touchdown, as well as a career-high 4 forced fumbles. Although Clowney accrued a lower sack total than his previous seasons, he provided some much needed quarterback pressure in a lackluster Seattle pass rush. The Seahawks then made a late-season trade in October, trading a 2020 fifth-round pick to the Detroit Lions for safety Quandre Diggs, in an effort to supplement the loss of Earl Thomas. Diggs indeed bolstered the Seattle secondary: producing 21 tackles, 3 interceptions, 3 pass deflections, 1 forced fumble, 1 fumble recovery, and a return touchdown during his 5 games with the team. 

On October 3, 2019, Seahawks owner Paul Allen was posthumously inducted into the Seahawks Ring of Honor before a 30–29 home victory against the Los Angeles Rams on Thursday Night Football.

After starting the season with a 10–2 record, they collapsed to a 1–3 finish in the final four games, due in part to injuries. With a Week 15 win over the Carolina Panthers, the Seahawks improved on their 10–6 record from the previous season. A loss by the Rams later that day clinched the Seahawks their seventh playoff appearance in the last eight seasons. In the playoffs, the Seahawks defeated the NFC East champion Philadelphia Eagles 17–9 in the Wild Card round, but lost 28–23 to the Green Bay Packers in the Divisional round. While they finished the regular season with an 11–5 record, they had just a +7 point differential, their worst in the Russell Wilson era.

Rookie wide receiver DK Metcalf made an immediate impact. His 89 receiving yards in Week 1 against the Cincinnati Bengals was the most ever by a Seahawks receiver in their rookie debut, passing Hall of Famer Steve Largent. He caught a total of 58 passes for 900 yards and 7 touchdowns, the second most catches and receiving yards by a rookie in franchise history. Metcalf also holds the NFL and franchise rookie record for most receiving yards in a playoff game, after a 160-yard performance against the Eagles during the Wild Card round.

Former Seahawks running back Marshawn Lynch returned due to a slew of injuries to other running backs. In 2019, all but four of the Seahawks' games were decided by one possession (8 or less points).

Draft

Notes
The Seahawks traded their first-round selection (21st overall) to the Green Bay Packers in exchange for Green Bay's first- and two fourth-round selections (30th, 114th and 118th overall).
The Kansas City Chiefs traded their first-round selection (29th overall) to the Seahawks in exchange for pass rusher Frank Clark.
The Seahawks traded their first-round selection (30th overall) to the New York Giants in exchange for New York's second-, fourth- and fifth-round selections (37th, 132nd and 142nd overall).
The Seahawks traded their second-round selection (37th overall) to the Carolina Panthers in exchange for Carolina's second- and third-round selections (47th and 77th overall).
The Seahawks traded their second-round selection (54th overall) to the Houston Texans in exchange for offensive tackle Duane Brown.
The Seahawks traded their third- and fourth-round selections (77th and 118th overall) to the New England Patriots in exchange for New England's second-round selection (64th overall).
The Seahawks traded their third- and fifth-round selections (92nd and 159th overall) to the Minnesota Vikings in exchange for Minnesota's third- and sixth-round selections (88th and 209th overall).
The Seahawks traded their fourth-round selection (114th overall) to the Minnesota Vikings in exchange for Minnesota's fourth- and sixth-round selections (120th and 204th overall).
The Seahawks traded their sixth-round selection (194th overall) to the Green Bay Packers in exchange for quarterback Brett Hundley.
The Seahawks traded their seventh-round selection (235th overall) to the Oakland Raiders in exchange for safety Shalom Luani.

Staff

Final roster

Preseason

Regular season

Schedule

Note: Intra-division opponents are in bold text.

Game summaries

Week 1: vs. Cincinnati Bengals

Week 2: at Pittsburgh Steelers

Week 3: vs. New Orleans Saints
 This was the first September home loss of the Russell Wilson/Pete Carroll era, as well as their first since 2009.

Week 4: at Arizona Cardinals

The Seahawks started the season 3–1 for the first time since 2016.

Week 5: vs. Los Angeles Rams

With the win, the Seahawks went to 4–1 for the first time since 2016.

Week 6: at Cleveland Browns

With the win, the Seahawks improved to 5–1 for the first time since their Super Bowl winning 2013 season.

Week 7: vs. Baltimore Ravens

Week 8: at Atlanta Falcons

Week 9: vs. Tampa Bay Buccaneers

Week 10: at San Francisco 49ers

Week 12: at Philadelphia Eagles

Week 13: vs. Minnesota Vikings

Week 14: at Los Angeles Rams

Week 15: at Carolina Panthers

Week 16: vs. Arizona Cardinals

Week 17: vs. San Francisco 49ers

Standings

Division

Conference

Postseason

Schedule

Game summaries

NFC Wild Card Playoffs: at (4) Philadelphia Eagles

NFC Divisional Playoffs: at (2) Green Bay Packers

References

External links

Seattle
Seattle Seahawks seasons
Seattle Seahawks